Vaade Iraade is a 1994 Indian Bollywood film directed by Kalpana Bhardwaj. It stars Ayush Kumar and Mamta Kulkarni in pivotal roles. It also stars Irrfan Khan in a side role.

Cast
 Ayush Kumar... Ajay Tripathi
 Mamta Kulkarni... Nikita Sekhri
 Suchitra Krishnamoorthi... Jyoti (Film Actress)
 Kulbhushan Kharbanda... Mr. Sekhri (Nikita's Father)
 Vijayendra Ghatge... Principal Tripathi
 Satyendra Kapoor... Dindayal Sidhu
 Rakesh Bedi... Bhatt (music director)
 Anjan Srivastav... Aziz Miyan (Publisher)
 Yunus Parvez... Baba
 Tiku Talsania... Natwarlal Lal
 Javed Khan... Nawab
 Irrfan Khan... Naresh Tripathi

Soundtrack

References

External links

1990s Hindi-language films
1994 films
Films scored by Jatin–Lalit